The Faculty of Medicine is a constituent body of the University of New South Wales, Australia.

The Faculty was established in June 1960 under founding dean Professor Frank Rundle. It has nine schools:
 School of Medical Sciences
 School of Psychiatry
 School of Public Health and Community Medicine
 School of Women's and Children's Health
 Prince of Wales Clinical School
 Rural Clinical School
 St George and Sutherland Clinical School
 St Vincent's Clinical School
 South Western Sydney Clinical School

References

External links 
 UNSW Faculty of Medicine website
UNSW School of Medical Sciences
UNSW Exercise Physiology

Medicine
Medical schools in Australia